Aadesh Shrivastava (4 September 1964 – 5 September 2015) was a music composer and singer of Indian music. Initially, he had worked as a drummer to music composers including R. D. Burman, Rajesh Roshan before working independently as a music director. Over the course of his career, he had composed music for over 100 Hindi films. Just a day after he turned 51, he died of cancer in Kokilaben Hospital.

Career

Born in a Hindu Kayastha family in Katni, Shrivastava got his first big break with the film Kanyadaan in 1993. Among the singers who sang in this movie, there was Lata Mangeshkar who sang his first song - Oh Sajna Dilbar, a duet with Udit Narayan, which became popular on the radio. But the film and the rest of the songs went unnoticed. The same thing happened with Jaane Tamanna, but he bounced back with Aao Pyaar Karen. One track "Haathon Mein Aa Gaya Jo Kal" was a hit. His other films are Salma Pe Dil Aa Gaya and Shastra. The song "Kya Ada Kya Jalwe Tere Paro", from the film Shastra got him in the limelight once again. In 1995, Shrivastava was a judge on Sa Re Ga Ma Pa.

Shrivastava sang a number of hit songs such as "Sona Sona", "Shava Shava", "Gustakhiyaan" and "Gur Nalon Ishq Mitha". He won accolades for his work in Kunwara, Tarkieb and Shikari in the year 2000. In 2001, his success continued with the movie Bas Itna Sa Khwaab Hai. In 2005, he was a judge on the talent hunt show Sa Re Ga Ma Pa Challenge 2005. The following year, he turned to direction with his short film on child prostitution, Sanaa. In 2009, he made a cameo in the film World Cupp 2011 and returned to television as a judge on Sa Re Ga Ma Pa Challenge 2009. His semi-classical song "Mora Piya" from Raajneeti became a hit in 2010.

On the international front, Shrivastava has collaborated with artists such as Akon, Julia Fordham and Wyclef Jean. Together with Akon, he has launched an India-wide talent search on the website hitlab.com which uses music analysis technology to predict the hit potential of new songs.
Other international artists he has collaborated with include Dominic Miller, Shakira and T-Pain.

Personal life
Shrivastava was married to Vijayta Pandit, actress and sister of music composer duo Jatin and Lalit Pandit and actress Sulakshana Pandit in 1990. They have two sons, Anivesh and Avitesh. His elder brother, Chitresh Shrivastava, owned Eyeline Telefilm and Events, the event management company implicated in the Rahat Fateh Ali Khan black money incident.  Chitresh died in a car accident in 2011.
Aadesh was diagnosed with multiple myeloma in December 2010 and underwent chemotherapy.

Death
It was reported in the media on 31 August 2015 that his cancer had relapsed for the third time since 2010 and that he had been hospitalised for more than a month. He died, in a coma, at 12:30 A.M. IST at Kokilaben Dhirubhai Ambani Hospital & Medical Research Institute, Mumbai, on 5 September 2015, a day after his 51st birthday. He was cremated at Oshiwara crematorium in Mumbai the same day.

Filmography

Background music
 2015 Welcome Back
 2011 Angel
 2009 Love Khichdi
 2006 Rehguzar
 2005 Paheli
 2004 Garv: Pride and Honour
 2004 Deewar - Let's Bring Our Heroes Home
 2004 Lakeer – Forbidden Lines
 2003 Zameen
 2003 Jaal: The Trap
 2003 LOC Kargil
 2002 Yeh Hai Jalwa
 2002 Humraaz
 2001 Dil Ne Phir Yaad Kiya
 2000 Refugee
 2000 Khauff
 2000 Badal
 2000 Champion
 1999 Haseena Maan Jaayegi
 1999 Bade Dilwala
 1998 Major Saab
 1998 Dushman
 1997 Border
 1995 The Don
 1995 Baazi
 1995 Suraksha
 1995 Ram Shastra
 1994 Imtehan
 1993 Khalnayak
 1993 Aadmi
 1993 Phool Aur Angaar
 1990 Sailaab

As composer
 2015 Dirty Politics
 2010 Khuda Kasam
 2010 Raajneeti
 2009 World Cupp 2011
 2009 Love Ka Tadka
 2009 Anubhav
 2008 Hari Puttar: A Comedy of Terrors
 2007 Godfather
 2007 Jahan Jaaeyega Hamen Paaeyega
 2006 Dil Se Pooch Kidhar Jaana Hai
 2006 Baabul
 2006 Rehguzar
 2006 Husn - Love & Betrayal
 2006 Alag
 2006 Saawan... The Love Season
 2006 Chingaari
 2006 Sandwich
 2005 Apaharan
 2004 Satya Bol
 2004 Deewar - Let's Bring Our Heroes Home
 2004 Dev
 2003 Baghban
 2003 Chalte Chalte
 2003 Kash Aap Hamare Hote
 2003 Love at Times Square
 2003 Surya
 2002 Aankhen
 2002 Junoon
 2001 Kabhi Khushi Kabhie Gham...
 2001 Deewaanapan
 2001 Rehnaa Hai Terre Dil Mein
 2001 Dil Ne Phir Yaad Kiya
 2001 Bas Itna Sa Khwaab Hai
 2001 Uljhan
 2001 Farz
 2000 Shikari
 2000 Joru Ka Ghulam
 2000 Kunwara
 2000 Sultaan
 2000 Tarkieb
 1999 International Khiladi
 1999 Lal Baadshah
 1999 Bade Dilwala
 1999 Dahek
 1998 Zulm-O-Sitam
 1998 Angaaray
 1998 Major Saab
 1998 Deewana Hoon Pagal Nahi
 1997 Bhai Bhai
 1997 Salma Pe Dil Aa Gaya
 1997 Humko Ishq Ne Mara
 1996 Raja Ki Aayegi Baraat
 1996 Shastra
 1996 Dil Tera Deewana
 1996 Apne Dam Par
 1995 Ram Shastra
 1995 Veergati
 1995 Sauda
 1994 Aao Pyaar Karen
 1994 Masti
 1991 Khatra
 1990 Saheb Jaade [ unreleased]
Kanyadan the first film of Aadesh

Playback singer

 2010 Mummyji-Papaji - Unreleased
 2010 Raajneeti
 2008 Hari Puttar: A Comedy of Terrors
 2007 Jahan Jaaeyega Hamen Paaeyega
 2006 Dil Se Pooch Kidhar Jaana Hai
 2006 Baabul
 2006 Rehguzar
 2006 Husn - Love & Betrayal
 2006 Alag
 2006 Chingaari
 2004 Dev
 2003 Baghban
 2002 Aankhen
 2000 Joru Ka Ghulam
 1999 Lal Baadshah
 1998 Angaaray
 1996 Apne Dam Par
 1995 Veergati
 1990 Agneepath (Song-Alibaba)

Accolades

See also
 List of Indian film music directors

References

External links

 

1964 births
2015 deaths
Indian film score composers
Bollywood playback singers
20th-century Indian musicians
Deaths from multiple myeloma
Deaths from cancer in India
People from Jabalpur